The dark wolf snake (Lycodon albofuscus)  is a species of snake in the family colubridae. It is found in Asia.

References 

Lycodon
Reptiles described in 1854
Reptiles of Borneo
Taxa named by André Marie Constant Duméril
Taxa named by Gabriel Bibron
Taxa named by Auguste Duméril
Fauna of Sumatra
Reptiles of Thailand